Animal Alpha was a five-piece Norwegian rock group formed in 2002 and disbanded in 2009.

History
The band spent much of 2004 playing shows around Norway. Their performance at Oslo's Øya Festival received 8 out of 10 points in the British magazine, Metal Hammer, and appeared on the national TV program Lydverket. The band later had two sold-out nights at the 500-crowd-capacity John Dee Live Club & Pub in Oslo. The band then signed with a small independent record label, Racing Junior, and planned the release of its first EP and album for spring 2005.

The producer Sylvia Massy recorded both the EP, Animal Alpha, and the album, Pheromones, at her studio in Weed, California.

Animal Alpha spent 2005 performing in Norway in support of the EP and album, which was released on September 5.

The EP achieved Gold status and the two singles/videos had national airplay. The band received nominations for Best Music Video for 2005 and Best Debut Artist. In winter 2006, the band played at industry festivals in the US, England and The Netherlands, and received offers from labels in the UK, US, Germany and other countries, while playing festivals in Europe.

A second album, You Pay for the Whole Seat, But You'll Only Need the Edge, was released on January 28, 2008.

The band had previously performed at festivals including Rock am Ring and Rock im Park, the Download Festival in England and Pukkelpop.

The song "Bundy" is used in the video games Burnout Revenge, Burnout Legends and NHL 06, all published by EA Games, as well as in the end credits of the action fantasy horror film Hansel & Gretel: Witch Hunters. The track "Fire! Fire! Fire!" was used during the end credits of the Norwegian comedy horror film Dead Snow and in the 2008 videogame MotorStorm: Pacific Rift.

On March 12, 2009, Animal Alpha disbanded. On its website and Myspace, a press release was posted saying that the band "found themselves in a creative deadlock while preparing for their third album and after evaluating the situation decided to call it quits". At least two of the band members were to pursue solo careers or other projects.

Discography
Singles
"Bundy"

EPs
Animal Alpha (2005)

Studio albums
Pheromones (2005)
You Pay for the Whole Seat, but You'll Only Need the Edge (2008)

Personnel
 Agnete Kjølsrud - lead vocals
 Christian Wibe - lead guitar, backing vocals
 Christer-Andre Cederberg - rhythm guitar, backing vocals
 Lars Imre Bidtnes - bass guitar, backing vocals
 Thomas Emil Jacobsen - drums, percussion
 Aleksander Ralla Villnes - drums, percussion

References

External links
Animal Alpha interview

Norwegian rock music groups
Musical groups established in 2002
2002 establishments in Norway
Musical groups disestablished in 2009
2009 disestablishments in Norway
Musical groups from Norway with local place of origin missing
Musical quintets